The California water resource region is one of 21 major geographic areas, or regions, in the first level of classification used by the United States Geological Survey in the United States hydrologic unit system, which is used to divide and sub-divide the United States into successively smaller hydrologic units. These geographic areas contain either the drainage area of a major river, or the combined drainage areas of a series of rivers.

This region includes the drainage within the United States that ultimately discharges into the Pacific Ocean within the state of California; and those parts of the Great Basin (or other closed basins) that discharge into the state of California. Includes parts of California, Nevada, and Oregon.

List of water resource subregions

See also
 List of rivers in the United States
 Groundwater recharge
 Water in California
 Principal aquifers of California

References

Lists of drainage basins
Drainage basins
Watersheds of the United States
Regions of the United States
 Resource
Water resource regions
Geography of California